Gârbou is a commune located in Sălaj County, Transylvania, Romania. It is composed of seven villages: Bezded (Bezdédtelek), Călacea (Kiskalocsa), Cernuc (Csernek), Fabrica (Cukorgyártelep), Gârbou, Popteleac (Paptelke) and Solomon (Gorbósalamon).

Sights 
 Wooden Church in Solomon, built in the 18th century, historic monument
 The ruins of the Haller Castle in Gârbou, built in the 18th century are a historic monument. Today, only the road to the castle survives shaded by the crowns of large chestnut trees, the stone arched entrance with the family crest and the ruins of the Catholic chapel.

References

Communes in Sălaj County
Localities in Transylvania